Chesley is both a given name and a surname. Notable people with the name include:

Given name
Chesley Bonestell (1888–1986), American artist
Chesley William Carter (1902–1994), Canadian politician
Chesley Crosbie (1905–1962), Canadian businessman and politician
Chesley V. Morton (born 1951), American politician, stockbroker
Chesley G. Peterson (1920–1990), United States Air Force general
Chesley Sullenberger (born 1951), American pilot
Chesley Goseyun Wilson (1932–2021), American musician

Surname
Al Chesley (born 1957), American football player
Anthony Chesley (born 1996), American football player
John Alexander Chesley (1837–1922), Canadian businessman and politician
Paul Chesley (born 1940), American photojournalist
Robert Chesley (1943–1990), American composer and playwright
Solomon Yeomans Chesley (1796–1880), Canadian politician

See also
Cheslie, given name